Wilbur Darwin Hockensmith Sr. (August 17, 1878 – August 19, 1951) was the head coach of the football team at the Western University of Pennsylvania, today known as the University of Pittsburgh Panthers, in 1901. On October 5, 1901, Hockensmith led the school to a victory over West Virginia University, a 12–0 shutout in Morgantown. This was Pitt's first victory in the Backyard Brawl. The team would also post a record 7 wins in 1901 under Hockensmith.

Hockensmith, who also played left guard for the university's football team, graduated from the Western University in 1901 with a degree in mechanical engineering. He later worked for his family's business, the Hockensmith Corporation, which ran a foundry in Irwin, Pennsylvania. Wilbur, his father (Frank Hockensmith) and son (Wilbur D. Hockensmith, Jr.) all served as the company's presidents.

Head coaching record

References

External links
 

1878 births
1951 deaths
American football guards
Pittsburgh Panthers football coaches
Pittsburgh Panthers football players
Swanson School of Engineering alumni
People from Westmoreland County, Pennsylvania
Players of American football from Pennsylvania